(19792009), better known as Saad bin Laden, was one of Osama bin Laden's sons. He continued in his father's footsteps by being active in Al Qaeda, and was being groomed to be his heir apparent. He was killed in an American drone strike in 2009.

Life
Born in 1979 in Jeddah, to the wealthy Bin Laden family. His paternal grandmother is a Syrian national called Hamida al-Attas.   He was believed to be married to a woman from Yemen. After 9/11, Saad bin Laden fled to Iran and was later detained and placed under house arrest by Iranian authorities. Iran stated that a number of al-Qaeda leaders and members were in their custody.

Bin Laden was implicated in the bombing of a Tunisian synagogue on 11 April 2002, which killed 19 people. In March 2003, there were disputed claims of his capture by Pakistan, though these proved false, and he was implicated in the 12 May 2003 suicide bombing in Riyadh, Saudi Arabia and the Morocco bombing four days later. However, bin Laden's family denied he was involved in the attacks.

In January 2009, however, U.S. Intelligence officials confirmed that bin Laden was no longer being held in Iranian custody and was likely hiding in Pakistan. Letters exchanged between Saad bin Laden and his brother Khalid bin Laden revealed that he fled from Iranian custody around this time and escaped to Pakistan, while many of his relatives were still detained. The report of his escape was also confirmed by his younger sister Eman bin Laden, who also managed to escape from Iranian custody and flee to Saudi Arabia.

Death
On 22 July 2009, National Public Radio reported that U.S. officials believe Saad bin Laden was killed by a CIA-administered unmanned aerial vehicle strike in Pakistan. A senior U.S. counterterrorism official said U.S. intelligence agencies are "80 to 85 percent" certain that bin Laden was killed in a missile strike "sometime this year."

On 24 July 2009, The Hindu reported that senior Taliban spokesmen claimed Saad bin Laden was not killed, or even hurt, during the missile attack. No evidence, however, surfaced to prove that bin Laden was still alive, and it was later reported that Osama bin Laden, shortly before his death during a Navy SEAL raid in 2011, was grooming his younger son Hamza bin Laden to be his heir apparent, a position that was originally bestowed to Saad. Letters retrieved from the compound where Osama bin Laden was killed in Abbottabad, Pakistan confirmed that Saad was killed.

In September 2012, al-Qaeda leader Ayman al-Zawahiri confirmed in a video message that Saad bin Laden was killed in a drone strike.

See also
Bin Laden family
Special Activities Division

References

1979 births
2009 deaths
Assassinated al-Qaeda leaders
Saad
Deaths by drone strikes of the Central Intelligence Agency in Pakistan
Fugitives
Saudi Arabian al-Qaeda members
Saudi Arabian people of Syrian descent
Saudi Arabian people of Yemeni descent
Saudi Arabian expatriates in Pakistan